Betty E. Komp (born 1949) is a Democratic former member of the Oregon House of Representatives, representing District 22 from 2004 until 2017.

Early life
Komp has previously worked as a farm hand, youth minister, teacher, and assistant principal.

Despite being a single mom, Komp returned to college and earned her BS and MS in Education from Western Oregon University.

Personal life
Komp has four daughters and six grandchildren.

Career
Betty Komp was formerly a member of the Oregon House of Representatives and served as Speaker Pro Tempore.

Political positions
 Made budget decisions as Chair of the Mt. Angel School Board
 Keep well-paying jobs
 stable funding for schools
 make sure tax dollars are spent wisely

References

External links
 Oregon State House - Betty Komp official government website
 Project Vote Smart - Representative Betty Komp (OR) profile
 Follow the Money - Betty E Komp
 2006 2004 2002 campaign contributions

1949 births
Living people
Members of the Oregon House of Representatives
Western Oregon University alumni
People from Woodburn, Oregon
People from Silverton, Oregon
Women state legislators in Oregon
21st-century American politicians
21st-century American women politicians